Steven John Dargavel (born 10 June 1966) is a former Australian  politician.

Dargavel was born in Traralgon, Victoria and received an Associate Diploma in Welfare Studies from Monash University.  He then worked as a youth refuge worker, youth housing worker and employment counsellor. He then became a research officer and, from 1996, an organiser for the Australian Manufacturing Workers Union.

Dargavel won a by-election in 1997 as the Australian Labor Party candidate for the House of Representatives seat of Fraser following the resignation of John Langmore to take up a position in the United Nations.  He was beaten for preselection for the seat for the 1998 election by Bob McMullan, when the electorate of Namadgi was abolished, leading to a reshuffling of Labor candidates between the Australian Capital Territory electorates.

Notes

Australian Labor Party members of the Parliament of Australia
Members of the Australian House of Representatives for Fraser (ACT)
Members of the Australian House of Representatives
1966 births
Living people
People from Traralgon
20th-century Australian politicians